

Western Hirondelle (specifically the Western PGK-1 Hirondelle) is a Canadian two-seat aircraft for cross country and recreational flying, designed by Western Aircraft Supplies to be homebuilt from plans. The name is French for the Swallow, and the model designation includes the initials of the designers Jean Peters, Glenn Gibb, and John Kopala.

Description
The prototype first flew in 1976. The Hirondelle is built primarily of wood and cloth. It is a low-wing cantilever monoplane with a fixed tail-wheel landing gear and seats two side-by-side.

The primary wing structure is a wood box spar connected to an aileron spar by ribs cut on a band saw. To the front of the main spar are strapped D-shaped fiberglass fuel tanks which can carry up to 12 imperial gallons per wing. Over the tanks is the framing and plywood skin of the wing's nose. Behind the main spar, the wings are covered in cloth. The wing section is the NACA 23012 with a  chord; the wing is rectangular, being straight and untapered. No flaps were fitted to the prototype, but they were being considered.

The fuselage is built up from spruce and covered in  plywood. The main gear uses Wittman tapered rods and was designed to take standard Cessna wheel pants. As with the Wittman Tailwind, the mains connect to the engine mount. The wing tanks feed a  header tank through automotive electric fuel pumps. The header tank feeds the engine by gravity.

The prototype weight includes an upholstered interior, a full electrical system and venturi driven gyros.

Specifications

See also

References
 
 Cox, Jack, "The PGK-1 Hirondelle," Sport Aviation 1978-01, pp. 23–25

Notes

External links
Western Aircraft Supplies PGK-1 Hirondelle specifications, image and video
Movie from a group of French PGK-1 builders

Homebuilt aircraft